Darko Dejanović (born 17 March 1995) is a Bosnian Serb professional footballer who most recently played as a goalkeeper for NK Jedinstvo Bihać in the First League of the Federation of Bosnia and Herzegovina.

Club career

Rad
Born in Banja Luka, then already capital of Republika Srpska, Dejanović played with youth categories of biggest local club FK Borac Banja Luka. His talent was spotted in Serbia by none less than FK Rad which sent him to their youth academy known as one of the best in the region. Shortly after he joined the main team. He started his senior career with Srem Jakovo, as a loaned player of FK Rad.

Dejanović spent a period between 2014 and 2015 playing with Žarkovo, where he also appeared as a loaned player. In April 2015, Dejanović signed his first professional contract with FK Rad. He made his Serbian SuperLiga debut in 29th fixture of the 2014–15 season. After Boris Radunović's departure, Dejanović started 2015–16 season as a first choice in front of goal, so he changed his squad number and took the number 1. 

Later, during the season, Rad signed Miloš Budaković and Nenad Filipović, so Dejanović made just 10 league and 1 cup appearances. He returned in the starting squad for the 4th fixture match of the 2016–17 Serbian SuperLiga, against Radnik Surdulica. He played 9 matches between August and October 2016, but later missed the rest of first half-season because of back surgery. With the end of May 2018, Dejanović mutually terminated a contract with Rad, and left the club as a free agent.

Zvijezda 09
In July 2018, Dejanović signed with Premier League of Bosnia and Herzegovina club FK Zvijezda 09. He made his debut for Zvijezda 09 on 25 August 2018, in a 0–4 home league loss against FK Sarajevo.

Jedinstvo Bihać
In August 2019, Dejanović signed a contract with First League of FBiH  club NK Jedinstvo Bihać. He made his official debut for Jedinstvo on 17 August 2019, in a 4–1 away league loss against NK Metalleghe-BSI.

International career
Dejanović made 1 appearance for the Bosnia and Herzegovina U17 national team in 2011.

Career statistics

Club

References

External links
 Darko Dejanović stats at utakmica.rs
 
 

1995 births
Living people
Sportspeople from Banja Luka
Serbs of Bosnia and Herzegovina
Association football goalkeepers
Serbian footballers
Bosnia and Herzegovina footballers
Bosnia and Herzegovina youth international footballers
FK Rad players
FK Srem Jakovo players
OFK Žarkovo players
FK Zvijezda 09 players
NK Jedinstvo Bihać players
Serbian SuperLiga players
Premier League of Bosnia and Herzegovina players